Rajabhakti Park  is a historically themed park honouring past Thai kings from the Sukhothai period to the current royal house of Chakri. It is in Hua Hin, Prachuap Khiri Khan Province, Thailand. It was built by the Royal Thai Army, on Thai Army property, with approximately one billion baht (US$28 million) in funds donated by the public and private sectors. King Bhumibol Adulyadej gave the historical park the name "Rajabhakti Park", which means 'the park that has been built with people's loyalty to the monarchs'. The park occupies an area of 222 rai (355,200 m2 or 36 ha).

Background

The Rajabhakti Park project was launched as a Royal Thai Army (RTA) initiative by General Udomdej Sitabutr when he was the army chief prior to his retirement at the end of September 2015. The Rajabhakti Park Foundation was established to raise funds for the project and to manage it.

Crown Prince Maha Vajiralongkorn, accompanied by his daughter, Princess Bajrakitiyabha, presided over the park's opening ceremonies on 26 September 2015.

Park layout

The park consists of three distinct areas. The first, covering an area of five rai (8,000 m2), is dominated by the statues of seven notable Thai kings. They are King Ram Khamhaeng (reigned 1279-1298) of the Sukhothai period, King Naresuan (1590-1605) and King Narai (1656-1688) of the Ayutthaya period, King Taksin (1767-1782) of the Thonburi period, and King Rama I (1782-1809), King Mongkut (1851-1868), and King Chulalongkorn (1868-1910) of the Rattanakosin period. Each statue is made of bronze, with an average height of 13.9 meters. They were designed by Thailand's Fine Arts Department. Casting of the statues and construction of the multi-purpose plaza took 10 months, from November 2014 to August 2015. There are plans to add statues of two additional kings in the future.

The base of the statues is 134 m long, 43 m wide, and 8 m high. It houses the park's second component, a museum of Thai history, focusing in particular on the biographies and achievements of the seven kings on display.

The park's large plaza of 91 rai (145,600 m2), is to be used by the Royal Thai Armed Forces for parades, ceremonies welcoming foreign dignitaries, and other special events. The park's peripheral area of 126 rai (201,600 m2) consists of the surrounding landscape and support facilities.

Controversy
In early-November 2015, anonymous Royal Thai Army officials complained to the Thai media about allegedly dodgy dealings related to park funding and procurement, followed by official denial that any public funding was involved. Of concern were seemingly high prices for land, equipment, and construction. There were also rumours of a middleman, later identified as Watcharapong Radomsittipat, who cited his connection to "people in authority" to demand commission fees from the owners of the foundries contracted to fabricate the statues. He was said to have demanded 10 percent kickbacks from each of the foundries commissioned to cast the bronze statues, reported to cost about 40 million baht (US$1.1 million) each. What followed was a deluge of stories about the park and questioning official efforts to derail the controversy.  "The [park] has been a public relations disaster for the junta, which said cleaning up corruption was one of its major reasons for seizing power."

Allegations
What was alleged in the Thai press focused primarily on the substantial kickbacks solicited for foundry contracts, but soon other shady dealings were alleged:
 Irregularities in the production and sale of 27,000 fundraising  "Rajabhakti Bike & Concert" tee shirts. The shirts are alleged to have been sold for 11.9 million baht while costing 6 million baht. The remaining 5.9 million baht was allegedly transferred to the private bank account of an army officer.
 Palm trees planted at the park cost as much as 100,000 baht each and one donor was charged 300,000 baht to have his name placed on a tree.
 Park fundraising events included a Chinese banquet which charged 500,000 baht (US$15,625) a table and seating at the VIP table for one million baht (US$31,250).
 Overall lack of fiscal transparency including official denial that state funds were spent on the park, when in reality 63.57 million baht (US$2 million) from the treasury was used "...on levelling land at the construction site,...".

Key players
 Amulet trader: Watcharapong Radomsittipat, who allegedly demanded and received kickbacks from statue foundries. He was thought to have fled to Hong Kong. He was cleared of wrongdoing in February 2016.
 Col Khachachart Boondee: Named deputy commander of the King's Guard by Gen Udomdej following the 2014 coup. Col Khachachart was tasked by Gen Udomdej with retrieving commissions from the amulet trader. Linked to alleged park corruption, he is thought to have fled to Myanmar.
 Defence Minister Prawit Wongsuwan: Ordered a defense ministry probe after the army's review "...proceeded too quickly and facilely, was entirely opaque on every important point and failed to answer key questions."
 Maj Gen Suchart Prommai: Named commander of the King's Guard by Gen Udomdej shortly after the 22 May 2014 coup, and later to an executive position in the park foundation. His whereabouts are unknown.
 Deputy Education Minister Gen Surachet Chaiwong: Deputy Chairman of the Rajabhakti Park Foundation. He represented the foundation in its dealings with the six foundries that cast the statues.
 Gen Theerachai Nakvanich:  Assumed the role of Royal Thai Army (RTA) commander on 1 October 2015 following the retirement of his predecessor, Gen Udomdej Sitabutr. Gen Theerachai admitted that more than one billion baht had been donated to fund the project, but declared that no military officers were involved in the alleged corruption.
 Gen Udomdej Sitabutr: Deputy Defense Minister and former army chief, served as Chairman of the Rajabhakti Foundation.

Statues and kickbacks

Chronology

References

External links
 "Prayut's 'war on corruption' will kick off soon". The Nation, 2015-05-28.
  "Thailand's Junta to Declare War on Corruption". The Diplomat, 2015-05-29.
 "Thailand: Detention of anti-corruption protesters shows increasing repression by military junta". Amnesty International, 2015-12-07.
 "Thai park exposes corruption claims and murky politics". BBC, 2015-12-11.
 "Unease Builds in Thailand Amid Royal Tribute". Wall Street Journal, 2015-12-11
 "Rajabhakti Park: The corruption case the Thai junta doesn’t want you to talk about". Saiyasombut, Saksith. Asian Correspondent, 2015-12-17

Parks in Thailand
Corruption in Thailand
Hua Hin District
Thai monarchy
2015 in Thailand
Monarchism in Thailand